Zardestan (also Romanized as Zardestān; also known as Zarestān) is a village in Gol Khandan Rural District, in the Bumehen District of Pardis County, Tehran Province, Iran. At the 2006 census, its population was 38, in 11 families.

References 

Populated places in Pardis County